Gyula Polgár (8 February 1912 – 26 June 1992) was a footballer who played for the Hungarian national team.

He played for Hungary in the 1938 FIFA World Cup Final, having not competed in any of the earlier fixtures in the tournament.

At the time of the 1938 tournament he was playing his club football with Ferencváros TC.

After the 1938 World Cup, he played in a friendly for Hungary against Scotland on 7 December 1938. In total he made 26 appearances for Hungary between 1932 and 1942, and scored two goals.

He later worked as a coach in Australia.

References

1912 births
1992 deaths
Hungarian footballers
Hungary international footballers
1934 FIFA World Cup players
1938 FIFA World Cup players
Ferencvárosi TC footballers
Association football defenders